2014 Auckland Open was a darts tournament that took place in Auckland, New Zealand on 20 September 2014.

Results

Men

Women

References

2014 in darts
2014 in New Zealand sport
Darts in New Zealand
September 2014 sports events in New Zealand